Bat Khurts is the former director of the Mongolia's General Intelligence Agency (GIA) (from 2014-2017) and former head of Executive Office of the Mongolian National Security Council and the former head of Independent Authority against Corruption (ATG).

Arrest
In September 2010, Khurts traveled to London. Upon landing, he was arrested and put in Wandsworth Prison because of a European Arrest Warrant issued by the German authorities. Consequently, the Mongolian government accused the UK of luring Khurts to London to be arrested.

Khurts was imprisoned for allegedly arranging the kidnapping of Enkhbat Damiran, a Mongolian national who emigrated to France, and sending him back to Mongolia where he was then tortured. It was alleged that around 15 May 2003, Damiran, who was seeking asylum in France at the time, was kidnapped by officers of the General Intelligence Agency of Mongolia outside a restaurant in the French port of Le Havre, smuggled across the border to Brussels, and then to the Mongolian embassy in Berlin. He was briefly held at the embassy before he was drugged and taken in a wheelchair onto a Mongolian MIAT flight to Ulaanbaatar on 18 May. His arrival in Ulaanbaatar was not registered by the border police and he was taken to a secret location outside the capital. He was tortured, unsuccessfully, to confess to the brutal murder of the well-known politician Zorig Sanjaasürengiin, a former Minister of Infrastructure and a potential future prime minister. On 24 May, he was registered as a GIA informant and his entry into Mongolia was subsequently registered by the border police as 25 May. During his torture, it was alleged that Damiran was, among other things, forced to sit on a stool for hours, beaten on the liver with a pistol, and subjected to a mock execution.

The Mongolian government apologized earlier for the kidnapping to the French, German and Belgian governments.

Khurts' arrest had led to tensions between the governments of Mongolia and the UK. The controversy has escalated to what has been called "diplomatic war". He was extradited to Germany in 2011 on charges of Verschleppung (Abduction or Kidnapping).

In September 2011, the charges of Verschleppung were dropped against Mr Khurts, three weeks ahead of a visit to Mongolia by German Chancellor Angela Merkel, and he was released from prison and returned to Mongolia.

References

Living people
Directors of intelligence agencies
Mongolian people imprisoned abroad
People extradited to Germany
People extradited from the United Kingdom
People deported from Germany
Year of birth missing (living people)